Ansar Al-Sharia fi Bilad Sinqit, better known as Ansar al-Sharia in Mauritania (English: Partisans of Islamic Law) is a radical Islamist group that operates in Mauritania.

Background
The Mauritanian Ansar al-Sharia was established by Islamists jailed in the countries Dar Naim central prison on 11 February 2013. Ahmed Salem Ould al-Hasan, one of the group's founders, described its purpose as combating secularists, implementing Sharia, and reinstating the position of Islamic scholars within the nation. The group was said to have been influenced by the founding and activities of Ansar al-Sharia (Tunisia)

At the time of its founding, it was joined by some Imams from extremist mosques and a few Mauritanian Islamist politicians.

References

Rebel groups in Mauritania
Islam in Mauritania
Jihadist groups